Caiapônia is a municipality in south-central Goiás state, Brazil.  It has the third largest  cattle herd in the state and is a major producer of grains. The town is also known as Torres Do Rio Bonito or just Rio Bonito.

History
Caiapônia derives its name from the Caiapó Indians who had fought wars with settlers until the end of the nineteenth century. The first church, Espírito Santo, was built in 1845 and by 1850 the settlement had several houses and was known as Torres do Rio Bonito. In 1855 its status as povoado passed to distrito and it became part of the municipality of Rio Verde. In 1871 Torres do Rio Bonito was raised to municipal status, the name being shortened to Rio Bonito in 1911.  Finally in 1943 the name was changed to Caiapônia, to honor the Indians who had lived in the area.

Geography
The main highways of access are GO-060 / Trindade, Goiás / Nazário / Firminópolis / Israelândia / Iporá / GO-221 /. It is part of the Sudoeste de Goiás Microregion and has municipal boundaries with Baliza, Bom Jardim de Goiás, Montividiu,  Rio Verde, Ivolândia, Palestina de Goiás, Doverlândia and Jataí.

Known as the city of the Thousand Waterfalls, the municipality has several rivers: Caiapó, Bonito, Paraíso, Peixe, Piranhas, Verdão, Claro and Doce. There are also many waterfalls: Torre, Freira, Gigante Adormedido, Cachoeira do Pantano, Cachoeira do Vale, Cachoeira do Salomão, and Cachoeira da Abóbora among others. Access is difficult but once there one can see transparent waters protected by thick tropical vegetation, containing orchids of several colors.

Villages in the area include Boa Vista and Planalto Verde.

Demographics (2007)
Population density in 2007: 1.82 inhabitants/km2 
Population growth rate 1996/2007:  0.93% 1996/2007
Total population in 2007: 15,747
Total population in 1980: 28,632
Urban population in 2007: 11,493
Rural population in 2007: 4,254 (the rural population was 15,677 in 1980)
Population change: the population decreased around 13,000 since 1980.

Economy
The economy is based on cattle-raising, with the third largest herd in the state of Goiás (415,000 head in 2006) and large plantations of corn, soybeans, and rice. Milk production is also very important.

Its numerous lakes, rivers and waterfalls provide attractions for tourists.

Economic data (2007)
Industrial establishments: 18
Financial Institutions in 2007: Banco do Brasil S.A., Banco Itaú S.A.
Retail establishments in 2007: 159 (Sepin 2007)

Motor vehicles
Automobiles: 894 (2007) 
Pickup trucks: 364
Number of inhabitants per motor vehicle: 11 (IBGE 2007)

Main agricultural products in hectares (2006)
cotton: 4,000
pineapple: 45      
rice:      4,000
banana: 10
coffee: 6
sugarcane: 35
beans: 1,450
sunflower: 200 
corn:      15,000
soybeans: 55,000
sorghum:   2,600 (Sepin 2006)

Farm data in hectares (2006)
Number of farms:                1,275
Total area:                  560,749 
Area of permanent crops:        3,316
Area of perennial crops:     33,761
Area of natural pasture:     366,896 
Persons dependent on farming: 3,450

Health and education
The health sector was represented by 03 hospitals with 48 beds (2007).  In 2006 there were 18 schools with 4,125 students.  There was no higher education as of 2007.  
Infant mortality in 2000: 18.25
Literacy rate: 82.4 (2000)
Ranking on the Municipal Human Development Index: 0.735
State ranking:  127 (out of 242 municipalities)
National ranking:  2,310 (out of 5,507 municipalities)

See also
List of municipalities in Goiás
Microregions of Goiás

References

Frigoletto

Municipalities in Goiás